Freedom State (2006) is a short independent narrative film written and directed by Cullen Hoback.

Plot summary
A woman named Krystal, unhappy with her husband and her life, checks into a small rural "mental health home". Her problem is that she may prefer a "crazy" state of mind and lifestyle to "normal" ones. The resident mental patients discover that Nurse Garrett, the facility supervisor, has absconded and conclude that the apocalypse (rapture) has occurred and the world has ended. Led by Krystal, who has been voted "President", most of the patients embark upon a whimsical school bus road trip, variously understood as a "quest" or a search for survivors or for the "end of the world". The bus driver is the home's former security guard, who is joining in with the hijinks. In the end, they all return to the home where Dax (Krystal's love interest) has decided he will not "check out" of the facility after all. The patients symbolically bury various objects in a grave and voice contempt for Nurse Garrett. Krystal burns a photo of her husband. Nurse Garrett returns to the home where the patients pummel her with cornbread. Krystal declares that she has decided she wants both "crazy" and "love".

External links
 

2006 films
American independent films
2006 comedy films
American comedy films
2000s English-language films
2000s American films